Oskar Emil Meyer (15 October 1834, Varel – 21 April 1909, Breslau) was a German physicist best known for his studies on the viscosity of gases. He was a younger brother to chemist Lothar von Meyer.

Biography 
From 1854 he studied sciences at the universities of Heidelberg, Zurich and Königsberg, where he was a student of Franz Ernst Neumann. In 1860 he received his doctorate with a dissertation on the friction between two liquids, titled De mutua duorum fluidorum frictione. In 1864 he succeeded Rudolf Lipschitz as an associate professor at the University of Breslau — teaching classes in mathematics and mathematical physics. During the following year he became a full professor at Breslau, and in 1867 succeeded Moritz Ludwig Frankenheim as director of the Physics Cabinet.

Published works 
In 1899 his influential Die kinetische Theorie der Gase. In elementarer Darstellung mit mathematischen Zusätzen was translated into English and published with the title "The kinetic theory of gases; elementary treatise with mathematical appendices". His other noteworthy written efforts are:
 Ueber die Reibung der Flüssigkeiten. Nachtrag, 1863 – On the friction of liquids.
 Vorlesungen über die Theorie der Elasticität der festen Körper und des Lichtäthers, 1885 (by Franz Ernst Neumann, edited by Meyer) – Lectures on the theory of elasticity of solid bodies and luminiferous aether. 
 Die Bestimmung der inneren Reibung nach Coulomb's Verfahren, 1887 –  On the definition of internal friction according to Coulomb's method.
 Gebirgsmagnetismus, 1889 – Geomagnetism.

References 

1834 births
1909 deaths
People from Varel
Academic staff of the University of Breslau
Heidelberg University alumni
University of Zurich alumni
University of Königsberg alumni
19th-century German physicists